"Just a Shadow" is a song by Scottish rock band Big Country on their 1984 album Steeltown. It was released as a single on 19 January 1985 and peaked at number 26 on the UK Singles Chart.

Critical reception
On its release, Mike Gardiner of Record Mirror was critical of the song, describing it as a "mediocre album track". He wrote, "The soaring guitars sound like their wings have been clipped and the chest the chorus is trying to swell probably has punctured lungs."

References

External links
 "Just a Shadow" at discogs.com
 "Just a Shadow" at allmusic.com

1984 songs
Big Country songs
Songs written by Stuart Adamson
Songs written by Mark Brzezicki
Songs written by Tony Butler (musician)
Songs written by Bruce Watson (guitarist)